Kadugodi is a suburb located in Whitefield, Bangalore in the state of Karnataka, India. The area is said to have been founded over 1000 years ago by the Chola dynasty.

Etymology
Deciphering the name kadugodi: Kadugodi is a combination of two words kadu and kodi. Looking into the Kannada grammar we understand that, when two words are joined, the first letter of the second word transforms into the next consonent. Hence Kadu+Kodi (ಕಾಡು+ಕೋಡಿ) becomes Kadugodi (ಕಾಡುಗೋಡಿ).
Kodi means a sluice gate that spills excess water when an inflow reaches more than the safe sustainability of a tank.  
This spillage flows through a canal to join another lake or river. Tanks may have one or two such exits depending upon the size and volume of the tank. 
Coming to the word kadu, it refers to forest and also graveyard. We understand that this has come from the sluice gate that was situated in the direction of a graveyard. And in the course of time this area would have grown as a village.
Like this we have Adugodi (ಆಡುಗೋಡಿ) and Hebbagodi (ಹೆಬ್ಬಗೋಡಿ). Of course, the place names symbolises our proud heritage.

Climate

Kadugudi is known for its pleasant climate throughout the year. Its elevation is the highest among the major large cities.

Kadugodi has a tropical savanna climate (Köppen climate classification Aw) with distinct wet and dry seasons. Due to its high elevation, Kadugodi usually enjoys a more moderate climate throughout the year.

Winter temperatures rarely drop below , and summer temperatures seldom exceed . Kadugodi receives rainfall from both the northeast and the southwest monsoons and the wettest months are September, October and August, in that order. The summer heat is moderated by fairly frequent thunderstorms. The heaviest rainfall recorded in a 11-hour period in recorded on 7 October 2012, has real thick water resource which is hard water in nature.

Infrastructure
Kadugodi has started seeing a residential construction, since the late 2000s and especially during 2010 and onwards.
In the 1970s, Kadugodi saw its first extension towards the west as Village Panchayat extension simply referred to as new extension or VP extension. In the 1980s, it saw another extension in the eastern direction when a new extension was formed by free distribution of plots to economically deserving families. This was done by the Eashwara temple family and was named after Shree Shankar Dixit, this area is now popularly known as Shankara pura.

Going by the street names of Kadugudi one can deduce that this place must have been a well planned out settlement. There is a Kumbhara beedi (potter street), there is Ganigara beedi (vegetable oil extractors), Angadi beedi (Market street), Balajigara beedhi (mainly merchants dealing in bangles, flowers etc.)

Neighborhood
The main neighborhoods in Kadugudi are Belathur, Seegehalli and Chanchandra.

Transport

Kadugodi is well connected to all parts of Bangalore by the road. The Hopefarm junction connects Kadugodi to the rest of the Bangalore city.

Kadugodi is easily accessible by the Bangalore Metropolitan Transport Corporation (BMTC) buses and all buses from Kempegowda Bus Station, K. R. Market and Shivajinagar towards HAL, Marathahalli, Varthur and Whitefield as well as Banashankari depart from Kadugodi.

The Namma Metro Station of Kadugodi is being built in as Kadugodi Industrial Area Metro Station. The project is estimated to be finished by March 2023.

Whitefield Railway Station is one of the oldest railway stations in the Bangalore.  It lies on the Bangalore-Chennai route and is double and electrifie; the Krishnarajapuram-Whitefield section is slated to be converted to a quadruple line. The station is slated to become a junction with a Whitefield-Kolar (53 km; 33 miles) line being laid. Whitefield railway station has four platforms, each running to 650m in length, shelters, lighting, benches and a booking office. Rails run here throughout the Day and Night from Whitefield Railway Station to Marikuppam, Kanniyakumari, Tirupati, Kolar, Jolarpettai, Bangarapet, Kuppam, as well as Krishnarajapuram, Bangalore Cantonment and Bangalore City Junction

Places of Worship 

Sri Sathya Sai Baba founded his Ashram "Brindavan" on 25 June 1960 with  colleges and hospital  here as later addition. It is 
a spiritual ashram and is a travellers destination for thousands from India and overseas.

Kadugodi has many temples and the oldest among them are Anjaneya temple, Kashi Vishwanatha temple, Ganesh temple, Eashwara temple and the grama devata temples of Maramma and Ganga Parameshwari. All these temples are located in Old Kadugodi area starting from Bapuji Circle up to Kashi Vishwanatha temple.

Kadugodi also has some of the oldest mosques, among them is Hajee Sir Ismailsait Mosque. It has been said that it was built by Hajee Ismalsait, in the 1900s. Considering how old it is, it's named as Badi Majied. It's also one of the most visited places in Kadugodi.

Kadugudi also has Our Lady of Lourdes Church.

Festivals
Two major festivities of Kadugudi is when Rathotsava (Charriot festival) are conducted for the Eashwara and Rama deities. Lot of festivities are conducted before and after the actual Rathotsava day.

Geographic location

Whitefield Metro is coming up and will be opened for operation soon. It is close to the local Railway Stn and Sathya Sai Ashram, Brindavan

Gallery

See also

 Institute of Wood Science and Technology
 Nandi Hills, India
 UB City
 National Military Memorial

References

External links
 Bruhat Bengaluru Mahanagara Palike – (Municipal government)

1537 establishments in India
High-technology business districts in India
Neighbourhoods in Bangalore